Fakeero Solanki, commonly known as Fakeero, is a Pakistani sculptor. He has made more than 352 sculptures.

He was born in Tando Allahyar to a Sindhi Hindu family of sculptors.

Awards
In August 2020, he received the Tamgha-e-Imtiaz.

References

Pakistani sculptors
Sindhi people
Pakistani Hindus
People from Tando Allahyar District
Recipients of Tamgha-e-Imtiaz
Year of birth missing (living people)
Living people